Sugar is an American film released on November 8, 2013 in conjunction with Homeless Youth Awareness Month. The film was directed by Rotimi Rainwater, written by Tony Aloupis and Rotimi Rainwater, and stars Shenae Grimes, Marshall Allman, Corbin Bleu, and Austin Williams.  The film is based on the experiences Rainwater had when he himself lived on the streets.

Plot
Based on true events experienced by Rotimi Rainwater, Sugar is the story of a young girl named Sugar with a troubled past trying to survive on the streets of Venice Beach. Sugar suffers from PTSD after losing her entire family in a horrific car crash. She survives with her group of outcast friends on the streets of Venice Beach, trying to find their own place in the world. Like so many homeless youth, Sugar is running from the pain of her past and will do anything to escape it. However, with the help of Bishop, her counselor in the youth shelter, she is able to reconnect with her uncle who has been searching for her. Sugar's new world starts to crumble when forced to confront the demons she's run from for the last two years. Sugar is an all too common story of a troubled youth learning how to stop hiding, and to start healing.

Production
Sugar began filming on November 30, 2010. The film was released theatrically in November 2013.

Reception 
In Los Angeles Times, Inkoo Kang said that "as a whole, the film's characters touchingly illustrate the tolls of living with unresolved trauma and chronic uncertainty, as well as the solidarity and relative freedom this community of outcasts enjoys."

References

External links
 
 

2013 films
Films shot in Venice, Los Angeles
2013 drama films
American drama films
Films about homelessness
Films set in Los Angeles
2010s English-language films
2010s American films